The meridian 23° east of Greenwich is a line of longitude that extends from the North Pole across the Arctic Ocean, the Atlantic Ocean, Europe, Africa, the Indian Ocean, the Southern Ocean, and Antarctica to the South Pole.

The 23rd meridian east forms a great circle with the 157th meridian west.

From Pole to Pole
Starting at the North Pole and heading south to the South Pole, the 23rd meridian east passes through:

{| class="wikitable plainrowheaders"
! scope="col" width="125" | Co-ordinates
! scope="col" | Country, territory or sea
! scope="col" | Notes
|-
| style="background:#b0e0e6;" | 
! scope="row" style="background:#b0e0e6;" | Arctic Ocean
| style="background:#b0e0e6;" |
|-
| 
! scope="row" | 
| Island of Nordaustlandet, Svalbard
|-
| style="background:#b0e0e6;" | 
! scope="row" style="background:#b0e0e6;" | Barents Sea
| style="background:#b0e0e6;" |
|-
| 
! scope="row" | 
| Island of Edgeøya, Svalbard
|-
| style="background:#b0e0e6;" | 
! scope="row" style="background:#b0e0e6;" | Barents Sea
| style="background:#b0e0e6;" |
|-
| style="background:#b0e0e6;" | 
! scope="row" style="background:#b0e0e6;" | Atlantic Ocean
| style="background:#b0e0e6;" | Norwegian Sea
|-valign="top"
| 
! scope="row" | 
| Islands of Sørøya, Seiland, Stjernøya and the mainland
|-
| 
! scope="row" | 
|
|-
| 
! scope="row" | 
|
|-
| style="background:#b0e0e6;" | 
! scope="row" style="background:#b0e0e6;" | Baltic Sea
| style="background:#b0e0e6;" | Gulf of Bothnia
|-
| 
! scope="row" | 
|
|-
| style="background:#b0e0e6;" | 
! scope="row" style="background:#b0e0e6;" | Baltic Sea
| style="background:#b0e0e6;" |
|-
| 
! scope="row" | 
| Island of Hiiumaa
|-
| style="background:#b0e0e6;" | 
! scope="row" style="background:#b0e0e6;" | Baltic Sea
| style="background:#b0e0e6;" | Kassaare Bay
|-
| 
! scope="row" | 
| Island of Saaremaa
|-valign="top"
| style="background:#b0e0e6;" | 
! scope="row" style="background:#b0e0e6;" | Baltic Sea
| style="background:#b0e0e6;" | Gulf of Riga - passing just west of the island of Ruhnu, 
|-
| 
! scope="row" | 
|
|-
| 
! scope="row" | 
|
|-
| 
! scope="row" | 
| Passing just west of Białystok
|-
| 
! scope="row" | 
| Lviv Oblast — passing just west of SambirZakarpattia Oblast — passing just east of Mukacheve
|-
| 
! scope="row" | 
|
|-
| 
! scope="row" | 
| For about 9 km
|-
| 
! scope="row" | 
|
|-
| 
! scope="row" | 
|
|-
| 
! scope="row" | 
| For about 7 km - easternmost point of the country
|-
| 
! scope="row" | 
|
|-
| 
! scope="row" | 
| For about 10 km - easternmost point of the country
|-
| 
! scope="row" | 
|
|-
| 
! scope="row" | 
|
|-
| style="background:#b0e0e6;" | 
! scope="row" style="background:#b0e0e6;" | Mediterranean Sea
| style="background:#b0e0e6;" | Aegean Sea
|-
| 
! scope="row" | 
| 
|-
| style="background:#b0e0e6;" | 
! scope="row" style="background:#b0e0e6;" | Mediterranean Sea
| style="background:#b0e0e6;" | Pagasetic Gulf, Aegean Sea
|-
| 
! scope="row" | 
| Mainland and island of Euboea
|-
| style="background:#b0e0e6;" | 
! scope="row" style="background:#b0e0e6;" | Mediterranean Sea
| style="background:#b0e0e6;" | Euripus Strait, Aegean Sea
|-
| 
! scope="row" | 
| 
|-
| style="background:#b0e0e6;" | 
! scope="row" style="background:#b0e0e6;" | Alkyonides Gulf
| style="background:#b0e0e6;" |
|-
| 
! scope="row" | 
| Peloponnese
|-
| style="background:#b0e0e6;" | 
! scope="row" style="background:#b0e0e6;" | Mediterranean Sea
| style="background:#b0e0e6;" | Argolic Gulf, Aegean Sea
|-
| 
! scope="row" | 
| Peloponnese
|-
| style="background:#b0e0e6;" | 
! scope="row" style="background:#b0e0e6;" | Mediterranean Sea
| style="background:#b0e0e6;" |
|-
| 
! scope="row" | 
| Island of Kythira
|-
| style="background:#b0e0e6;" | 
! scope="row" style="background:#b0e0e6;" | Mediterranean Sea
| style="background:#b0e0e6;" |
|-
| 
! scope="row" | 
|
|-
| 
! scope="row" | 
|
|-
| 
! scope="row" | 
|
|-
| 
! scope="row" | 
|
|-
| 
! scope="row" | 
|
|-
| 
! scope="row" | 
|
|-
| 
! scope="row" | 
|
|-
| 
! scope="row" | 
|
|-
| 
! scope="row" | 
| Caprivi Strip
|-
| 
! scope="row" | 
|
|-valign="top"
| 
! scope="row" | 
| North West Northern Cape Western Cape Eastern Cape Western Cape
|-
| style="background:#b0e0e6;" | 
! scope="row" style="background:#b0e0e6;" | Indian Ocean
| style="background:#b0e0e6;" |
|-
| style="background:#b0e0e6;" | 
! scope="row" style="background:#b0e0e6;" | Southern Ocean
| style="background:#b0e0e6;" |
|-
| 
! scope="row" | Antarctica
| Queen Maud Land, claimed by 
|-
|}

Meridian 22.5° East

Meridian 22.5° East crosses most countries (sovereign states) from all meridians: 26 in total. When Svalbard (in the North) and Antarctica (in the South) are added it crosses 28 territories.

From North to South: Norway, Finland, Sweden, Estonia, Latvia, Lithuania, Russia (Kaliningrad), Poland, Slovakia, Ukraine, Hungary, Romania, Serbia, Bulgaria, North Macedonia, Greece, Libya, Chad, Sudan, Central African Republic, Congo Democratic Republic, Angola, Zambia, Namibia, Botswana and South Africa.

The line could be drawn from Tappeluft in Norway (the most northern town on mainland on this meridian) to George in South Africa (the most southern city on this meridian) which is 11,573 km. It crosses also Turku in Finland. Meridian 22° East misses Ukraine  and Bulgaria and Meridian 23° East misses Russia (Kaliningrad) and Slovakia. Halfway both meridians, on 22.5° EL, those missing countries are on the line.

See also
22nd meridian east
24th meridian east

e023 meridian east